Nilópolis is a municipality in Brazil, located in the Rio de Janeiro state's southwestern region, bordering São João de Meriti, Mesquita and Rio de Janeiro. It is the smallest municipality in Rio de Janeiro state, with a total area of 19.39 km2. The population of 162,693 inhabitants living in an area of 9 km2 and the remaining area corresponds to the Gericinó's Natural Park. Officially, the population density exceeds 8,120 inhabitants/km2, but if calculated just 9 km2 occupied, it becomes the most densely populated city in Brazil with more than 17.400 inhabitants/km2. Currently, São João de Meriti has the highest population density, with 12,897 inhabitants/km2.

The city was named after Nilo Peçanha, a President of Brazil.

Beija Flor

Nilópolis is famous for its Grêmio Recreativo Escola de Samba Beija-Flor de Nilópolis, one of the most successful and luxurious Samba schools and usually a top contender for winning the carnival parade in Rio.

References

External links 
  Prefeitura de Nilópolis (Nilópolis City Hall)
  Baixada Fácil (Nilópolis history)

Municipalities in Rio de Janeiro (state)